Hinduism is a minority religion in Cambodia which is followed by nearly 1,000 individuals. Even being a small minority in the Buddhist majority nation it highly influences the vast culture and history of Cambodia with being prominent religion under the Khmer Empire. Today most of the Cambodian Hindus are Indians in Cambodia.

History 
Hinduism has been said to be present in Cambodia from  through the trade routes and networks by traders from India and expansion of Greater India. Hindu culture is said to have influenced the Cambodia and had been an important part of the Funan polity with Indosphere and it was characterised as: "high population and urban centers, the production of surplus food...socio-political stratification [and] legitimized by Indian religious ideologies". There was also present of Purohita for the religious traditions and customs with mention of the land as 'Kambujadesha'. Many Hindu cults were established with the patronisation of Hinduism in the Chenla Kingdom.

After the formation of Khmer Empire, the founder Jayavarman II in the 9th-century titled him as 'Devaraja' and declared as himself as 'Chakravartin' as per Hindu rituals, Hinduism was at the peak with construction of many Hindu temple in Khmer architecture and Sanskrit was used as sacred language. Hinduism was at the peak under the Khmer Empire and was the official religion of the state, until the 14th-century after the conversion of the royal family to Theravada Buddhism and slowly causing the decline of the Hindu population in country replaced by Buddhism from Shaivism.

See also 
 Hinduism in Southeast Asia

References 

 
Hinduism in Southeast Asia
Religion in Cambodia